Barbora Patočková (born 23 September 1998 in Polička) is a Czech ice hockey player for HC Příbram woman, HC Hvězda Praha and the Czech national team.

She participated at the 2016 IIHF Women's World Championship. She started play ice hockey with her brother Matouš Patočka in HC Slavoj Velké Popovice. Then they move to Slavia Prague. 

She also participated at the 2017 Ball Hockey World Championship in Pardubice and won gold medal for Czech national team.

Reference

External links

1998 births
Living people
Czech women's ice hockey forwards
People from Polička
Sportspeople from the Pardubice Region
Universiade medalists in ice hockey
Medalists at the 2023 Winter World University Games
Universiade bronze medalists for the Czech Republic
Ball hockey players
Czech expatriate ice hockey players in Sweden
Czech expatriate sportspeople in Kazakhstan
Expatriate ice hockey players in Kazakhstan